Pleuronectes is a genus of righteye flounders found in the northern oceans.

Species
There are currently three recognized species in this genus:
 Pleuronectes platessa Linnaeus, 1758 (European plaice)
 Pleuronectes putnami (T. N. Gill, 1864) (American smooth flounder)
 Pleuronectes quadrituberculatus Pallas, 1814 (Alaska plaice)

References 

 
Pleuronectidae
Taxa named by Carl Linnaeus
Marine fish genera
Taxonomy articles created by Polbot